Miron Bleiberg is an Israeli-Australian football (soccer) manager.

Biography
Bleiberg was educated at the Hebrew Reali School in Haifa, Israel. A former captain in the Israeli Navy, Bleiberg commanded patrol boats and missile boats, covering the coastline from Haifa to Sinai and the Red Sea. In Israel, he coached Hapoel HaTzair Kiryat Haim, which at the time played in Liga Bet, the fourth tier of Israeli football league system. After moving to Australia, he coached Melbourne Croatia for the 1985 and 1986 NSL seasons. The following year he coached Maribyrnong Polonia for the initial 12 rounds, until the club fell into financial difficulties.

The team eventually went on to win the 1987 Victorian State League title. This was followed by stints at Croydon City, Heidelberg United and the Brisbane Strikers, before going on to secure a string of successes in the Queensland Premier League with NorthStar and Queensland Lions.

Queensland Roar
Appointed the coach of the Queensland Roar for the inaugural season of the A-League, the Roar missed the finals, although the side's entertaining style of football won plaudits from the media and supporters. Bleiberg's outspoken views and colourful quotes in the style of Jose Mourinho has made many headlines. After the Roar slipped from an auspicious start to the 2006/7 season to fourth position following Round 15, Bleiberg resigned as coach and was replaced by former Socceroos coach Frank Farina.

Gold Coast United FC
Bleiberg had backed a new A-League club Gold Coast Galaxy, to be based on the Gold Coast, Queensland. Ultimately, the Galaxy consortium led by real estate magnate Fred Taplin, was trumped by a rival bid from mining billionaire Clive Palmer. Upon receiving expansion approval from the FFA, Palmer appointed Bleiberg as head coach and football director for Gold Coast United. In their first two seasons, Gold Coast made the finals, finishing an impressive 3rd in their debut season. In what was a world's first for football, Bleiberg was miked-up during the game against Wellington Phoenix in round 15 on 15 January 2012, providing insight into a head coach on game day.

During the week preceding the game with Melbourne Heart on 18 February 2012, Gold Coast owner Clive Palmer announced that he would be giving 17-year-old Mitch Cooper the Captaincy on his A-League debut, replacing suspended skipper Michael Thwaite. In response to the announcement, Bleiberg claimed that the appointment was a merely ceremonial move, allowing him to take the coin toss, then allow Kristian Rees to take over the on-field captaining.

However, Clive Palmer suspended Bleiberg for the game against Heart, unhappy with Bleibergs comments over the move. The suspension was soon made indefinite, with Gold Coast CEO Clive Mensink claiming it was inappropriate for Bleiberg not to take the appointment seriously. and that the comments made were disrespectful to Cooper and Palmer. On Sunday, 19 February, Bleiberg walked out on the club, claiming that Palmer took away his dignity and had been deeply offended by the move to suspend him.

Oakleigh Cannons FC
Bleiberg joined Victorian Premier League club Oakleigh Cannons FC five rounds into the 2013 season, after Oakleigh parted ways with former manager Bill Theodoropoulos. In April 2015, Bleiberg departed the Cannons, being replaced by Arthur Papas.

Managerial statistics

Honours
NSL Cup
1986 (Melbourne Croatia)
Victoria State League
1987 (Maribyrnong Polonia)
Queensland Premier League and Grand Final
1994 (North Star)
1996, 1997, 1998, 1999, 2001, 2002, 2003, 2004 (Brisbane/QLD Lions)

References

External links
 Gold Coast United profile
 Jerusalem Post feature article
 Oz Football profile

1955 births
Israeli Jews
Living people
Australian Jews
Israeli footballers
Australian soccer players
Maccabi Haifa F.C. players
Israeli football managers
Israeli emigrants to Australia
Brisbane Roar FC managers
Gold Coast United FC managers
Expatriate soccer managers in Australia
A-League Men managers
Oakleigh Cannons FC managers
Sportspeople from Haifa
Australian people of Israeli descent
Western Eagles FC managers
Association footballers not categorized by position
Brisbane Strikers coaches
Melbourne Knights FC managers